In Greek mythology,  Anthracia (Ancient Greek: Ἀνθρακία), was an Arcadian nymph. Together with other nymphs, Neda, Hagno, Anchiroe and Myrtoessa, were nurses of the god Zeus. She was depicted to  hold a torch.

Note

References 
 Pausanias, Description of Greece with an English Translation by W.H.S. Jones, Litt.D., and H.A. Ormerod, M.A., in 4 Volumes. Cambridge, MA, Harvard University Press; London, William Heinemann Ltd. 1918. . Online version at the Perseus Digital Library
Pausanias, Graeciae Descriptio. 3 vols. Leipzig, Teubner. 1903.  Greek text available at the Perseus Digital Library.

Nymphs

Arcadian mythology